Neil Griffiths may refer to:

 Neil Griffiths (novelist), British novelist
 Neil Griffiths (footballer) (born 1951), former English footballer